Eat This, Not That! (ETNT) is a media franchise owned and operated by co-author David Zinczenko. The original book series, developed from a column from Men's Health magazine written by David Zinczenko and Matt Goulding and since 2012, has sold over 8 million copies. The franchise now includes a website, quarterly magazine, videos, e-books and downloadable PDFs.

ETNT brands itself as the "No-diet weight loss solution" and makes recommendations about food choices with the aim of improving health. Criteria for unhealthy dishes center on high levels of calories, fat, saturated fat, trans fat, sodium and/or sugar content. The healthier alternatives often include higher levels of fiber and/or protein. 

A quarterly magazine, Eat This, Not That!, was launched in 2015 and is distributed by Meredith nationwide.

Digital 
Eatthis.com is a website that promotes healthy living and provides suggested food alternatives in order to eat healthier and lose weight. The family-friendly website has 5 million monthly viewers and syndicate relations with Yahoo! and MSN.

Print

Eat This, Not That! for Kids
"ETNT for Kids" is the second book in the "Eat This, Not That!" series and was published in August 2008. This book follows the same format as its predecessor and guides readers toward the healthiest meal choices for children at popular restaurant chains. Additionally, it includes a restaurant report card, grading America's most popular fast-food and sit-down restaurants with letter grades. Restaurants that did not provide nutritional information received an automatic "F" grade.

Eat This, Not That! Supermarket Survival Guide
Published in December 2008, the Supermarket Survival Guide addresses grocery stores, food shopping, and methods of swapping out an unhealthy product for a better one. It provides label decoders (defining claims like "free-range" or "organic") and nutritional values on all the various areas of the supermarket (such as the produce section, meat counter, and cereal aisles). A shopper can use this book to filter through the multiple brand choices and discern what product is the healthiest option.

Eat This, Not That! Restaurant Survival Guide 
Published in November 2009, this restaurant guide summarizes the best and worst meal choices at popular restaurants, hotel buffets, convenience stores, movie theaters, vending machines, and airport and amusement park eateries. The guide breaks down the best and worst meal selections by calories, fat, sugar, and/or sodium. Extra points are given to foods that are high in protein and fiber. The book includes restaurant menus of different cuisines, including Japanese, barbecue, Chinese, and deli, identifies popular dishes, and provides tips on what to order.

Cook This, Not That! Kitchen Survival Guide 
Published in December 2009, this recipe book provides meal ideas for breakfast, appetizers, soups, salads, sandwiches, barbecues, traditional American dishes, international cuisine, snacks, and desserts. Each recipe supplies a breakdown of the nutritional information, serving size, and cost per dish. The homemade recipes' calories are compared to a chain restaurant's version of each meal, showing a stark difference in nutrition and price. The book also offers a snack matrix of healthy choices (i.e., black bean chips and hummus).

Drink This, Not That! 
Published in May 2010, this book exposes drinks with high sugar concentration and provides information on healthier alternatives to favorite drinks such as coffee, alcoholic beverages, and sports drinks. It includes nutritional information on beverages sold at supermarkets, restaurants, fast-food chains, and liquor stores.

Eat This, Not That! The Best (& Worst) Foods in America 
Published in June 2010, Eat This, Not That! The Best (& Worst) Foods in America addresses popular American foods and lists the best and worst dishes available at chain restaurants. The book guides readers through various restaurants, cuisines, and foods with 24 chapters covering topics such as "Best (& Worst) Foods in America," "Best (& Worst) Pizzas in America," "Best (& Worst) Drinks in America," and "Best (& Worst) Foods for Your Blood Pressure."

Cook This, Not That! 350-Calorie Meals 
The book promotes cooking at home rather than eating at a restaurant to eat healthier and save money.

Eat This, Not That! (All New) Supermarket Survival Guide
Published in December 2011, the All-New Supermarket Survival Guide is updated to include new food products at the time of publishing. The book has been updated and expanded.

Eat This, Not That! When You're Expecting
Published in June 2015, this "complete guide to the very best foods for every stage of your pregnancy" is by Zinczenko and Dr. Jennifer Ashton, ABC News' Chief Women's Health Correspondent. It is the first pregnancy book written by a Board-certified OB/GYN who is also Board-certified in obesity medicine and has a master's degree in Clinical Nutrition from Columbia University.

Reviews
The original ETNT was reviewed by Tara Parker-Pope of The New York Times. Well Blog writes, "The comparisons are always interesting and often surprising." However, critics did not agree with every comparison. Parker-Pope went on to write, "Chances are you won't agree with every item.

Dawn Jackson Blatner, the spokeswoman for the American Dietetic Association, said in USA Today, "There are several healthful options for the restaurants. These are real changes people can make to save hundreds of calories."

References

2007 non-fiction books
2008 non-fiction books
2009 non-fiction books
2010 non-fiction books
2011 non-fiction books
2012 non-fiction books
2013 non-fiction books
Health and wellness books
Dieting books
Rodale, Inc. books
Books about food and drink